This is a list of Royal Observer Corps (ROC) nuclear monitoring posts incorporated into the United Kingdom Warning and Monitoring Organisation (UKWMO).

List of Royal Observer Corps / United Kingdom Warning and Monitoring Organisation Posts (A–E)
List of Royal Observer Corps / United Kingdom Warning and Monitoring Organisation Posts (F–K)
List of Royal Observer Corps / United Kingdom Warning and Monitoring Organisation Posts (L–P)

Notes:-
 1. Many of these underground bunkers still exist under private ownership, permission of the owner is paramount before attempting to locate them.
 2. With a few exceptions the surviving bunkers are in varying states of dereliction and are unsafe.
 3. Counties listed are contemporary which may differ from present counties.

data from:- and

See also
 Commandant Royal Observer Corps
 Aircraft recognition
 Royal Observer Corps Monitoring Post
 Operational instruments of the Royal Observer Corps
 AWDREY
 Bomb Power Indicator
 Ground Zero Indicator
 Fixed Survey Meter
 United Kingdom Warning and Monitoring Organisation
 Four-minute warning
 Royal Observer Corps Medal
 Skywatch march
 RAF Bentley Priory
 Aircraft Identity Corps (Canada)
 Volunteer Air Observers Corps (Australia)
 Ground Observer Corps (USA)
 Civil Air Patrol (USA)
 List of ROC Group Headquarters and UKWMO Sector controls

References

External links
 
  
 

1925 establishments in the United Kingdom
Military units and formations established in 1941
Military units and formations disestablished in 1995
Obs
United Kingdom in World War I
Operation Overlord
Cold War military equipment of the United Kingdom
Cold War military history of the United Kingdom
World War II sites in the United Kingdom

no:Royal Observer Corps